Lesikovka is a rural locality (a settlement) in Alexeyevsky District, Belgorod Oblast, Russia. The population was 28 as of 2010. There is 1 street.

Geography 
Lesikovka is located 51 km southeast of Alexeyevka (the district's administrative centre) by road. Sovetskoye is the nearest rural locality.

References 

Rural localities in Alexeyevsky District, Belgorod Oblast
Biryuchensky Uyezd